"Golden Slumbers" is a song by the English rock band the Beatles from their 1969 album Abbey Road. Written by Paul McCartney and credited to Lennon–McCartney, it is the sixth song of the album's climactic B-side medley. The song is followed by "Carry That Weight" and begins the progression that leads to the end of the album. The two songs were recorded together as a single piece, and both contain strings and brass arranged and scored by producer George Martin.

Background
"Golden Slumbers" is based on the poem "Cradle Song" from the play Patient Grissel, a lullaby by the dramatist Thomas Dekker. McCartney saw sheet music for "Cradle Song" at his father's home in Liverpool, left on a piano by his stepsister Ruth. Unable to read music, he created his own music. McCartney uses the first stanza of the original poem, with minor word changes, adding to it a single lyric line repeated with minor variation. In the 1885 collection "St Nicholas Songs", p. 177, is W J Henderson's music set to the poem, titled "Golden Slumbers Kiss Your Eyes". Abbey Road does not credit Dekker with the stanza or with the title. Thomas Dekker's poem was set to music by W J Henderson in 1885, Peter Warlock in 1918, also by Charles Villiers Stanford and Alfredo Casella.

Recording
McCartney was the lead vocalist. He begins the song in a soft tone appropriate for a lullaby, with piano, bass guitar, and string section accompaniment. The drums come in on the line "Golden slumbers fill your eyes", and McCartney switches to a stronger tone, both of which emphasise the switch to the refrain. McCartney said, "I remember trying to get a very strong vocal on it, because it was such a gentle theme, so I worked on the strength of the vocal on it, and ended up quite pleased with it."

The main recording session for "Golden Slumbers"/"Carry That Weight" was on 2 July 1969. John Lennon was not present, as he had been injured in a motor vehicle accident in Scotland on 1 July, and was hospitalised there until 6 July.

Drums, timpani, and additional vocals were added in an overdub session on 31 July, the same day the first trial edit of the side two medley was created, with Lennon participating in the session. On 15 August, orchestral overdubs that marked 30 musicians altogether were added to "Golden Slumbers" and five other songs on Abbey Road.

Scottish band White Trash recorded "Golden Slumbers/Carry That Weight" which was released as a single on Apple Records a week prior to the Abbey Road release.

Personnel
According to Ian MacDonald:

The Beatles
 Paul McCartney – lead vocals, piano
 George Harrison – 6-string bass guitar
 Ringo Starr – drums, timpani

Additional musicians
 Unnamed session musicians – twelve violins, four violas, four cellos, double bass, four horns, three trumpets, trombone, bass trombone
 George Martin – orchestral arrangement

Cover versions
 American guitarist George Benson covered the song in a medley with "You Never Give Me Your Money" on his 1970 album The Other Side of Abbey Road.
In 2001, Ben Folds covered the song for the soundtrack of the film I Am Sam. This version was also used to accompany the second trailer for Steven Spielberg's 2022 semi-autobiographical film The Fabelmans.
In 2006, Nia Vardalos, better known for comedy acting and as a playwright/screenwriter than for singing, covered "Golden Slumbers" as one of the participants in Unexpected Dreams - Songs from the Stars, a compilation album released that year.
American singer Judy Collins covered the song on her 2007 album Judy Collins Sings Lennon and McCartney.
 The song is featured twice in the 2016 animated film Sing, sung by Jennifer Hudson. The song also appears on the film's soundtrack with "Carry That Weight" as a medley.
Elbow recorded a cover of the song for the 2017 John Lewis Christmas TV advert. The single reached No. 29 in the UK, and appears on the Elbow compilation album The Best Of.
Dua Lipa covered the song as a part of her Live Acoustic EP in 2017.

Notes

References

External links

1969 songs
1969 singles
The Beatles songs
Song recordings produced by George Martin
Songs written by Lennon–McCartney
Songs published by Northern Songs
Songs based on poems
Rock ballads
1960s ballads
Songs about sleep
1600s poems